EcoGP, officially the Eco Grand Prix,  is a European 24-hour car race for electric cars. The green series was conceived in 2013 by the world record holder Rafael de Mestre. In 2018, the world's first 24-hour race for electric cars started in the Motorsport Arena in Germany. The series has been a member of DMSB (German Motor Sport Federation) since 2020. 

The 24-hour race is won by the car that covers the greatest distance in 24 hours. The role model for the series was the 24 Hours of Le Mans. Drivers in the cup included Jutta Kleinschmidt, Michel von Tell and Rafael de Mestre.

It was the first series in which a Tesla S took part.

Forty drivers take part in the race. In addition to Porsche, BMW, Tesla and Jaguar, prototypes are also part of the Grand Prix.

Among the racing tracks are Transilvania Motor Ring, Nürburgring, Zell am See, Motorsport Arena Oschersleben and Valencia.

See also 

 Electric motorsport
 Extreme E

References

External links 
 Official Website

Green racing